
Year 515 (DXV) was a common year starting on Thursday (link will display the full calendar) of the Julian calendar. At the time, it was known as the Year of the Consulship of Florentius and Anthemius (or, less frequently, year 1268 Ab urbe condita). The denomination 515 for this year has been used since the early medieval period, when the Anno Domini calendar era became the prevalent method in Europe for naming years.

Events 
 By place 

 Byzantine Empire 
 Autumn – Revolt of Vitalian:  Byzantine general (magister militum) Vitalian mobilises his army, and marches again towards Constantinople. He captures the suburb of Sycae (modern Turkey) across the Golden Horn, and encamps there.
 Emperor Anastasius I gives Marinus, former praetorian prefect of the East, command over the Byzantine army. He defeats the rebel fleet at the harbor entrance, using a sulfur-based chemical substance, similar to the later Greek fire.
 Marinus lands with an army on the shore of Sycae and defeats the rebels. Disheartened by the losses suffered, Vitalian flees north under cover of the night. 
 As a sign of his victory, Anastasius I leads a procession to Sosthenion, and attends a service of thanks at the local church dedicated to the Archangel Michael.
 Empress Ariadne, wife of Emperor Anastasius I, dies at Constantinople and is buried in the Church of the Holy Apostles.

 Europe 
 Amalasuintha, daughter of king Theodoric the Great, marries Eutharic, an Ostrogoth noble of the old Amal line.

 By topic 

 Religion 
 The St. Maurice's Abbey (Switzerland) is founded by Sigismund of Burgundy. He sets up five groups of monks to whom he entrusts the liturgy of the praise of God.

Births 
 Approximate date – Cainnech of Aghaboe, Irish abbot and saint (d. 600)
 Hulü Guang, general of Northern Qi (d. 572)
 Yuwen Hu, regent of Northern Zhou (d. 572)

Deaths 
 Ariadne, Byzantine empress 
 Euphemius, patriarch of Constantinople
 Gao Zhao, high official of Northern Wei
 Xuan Wu Di, emperor of Northern Wei (b. 483)

References 

Bibliography